The historic centre of Florence is part of quartiere 1 of the Italian city of Florence. This quarter was named a World Heritage Site by UNESCO in 1982.

Built on the site of an Etruscan settlement, Florence, the symbol of the Renaissance, rose to economic and cultural pre-eminence under the Medici in the 15th and 16th centuries. Its 600 years of extraordinary artistic activity can be seen above all in the 13th-century cathedral (Santa Maria del Fiore), the Church of Santa Croce, the Uffizi and the Pitti Palace, the work of great masters such as Giotto, Filippo Brunelleschi, Sandro Botticelli and Michelangelo.

Aspect
Closed inside the avenues traced on the old medieval walls, the historic centre of Florence collects the city's most important cultural heritage sites. Delimited by the 14th century wall circuit, built thanks to the economic and commercial power reached at the time, knew its maximum splendor in the following two centuries.

Spiritual center of the city is Piazza del Duomo with the Cathedral of Santa Maria del Fiore, flanked by Giotto's Campanile and facing the Baptistry of Saint John with the 'Gates of Paradise' by Lorenzo Ghiberti. From here to the north there are the Palazzo Medici Riccardi by Michelozzo, the Basilica of Saint Lawrence by Filippo Brunelleschi, with the precious sacristies of Donatello and Michelangelo. Furthermore, the Museum of San Marco with masterpieces by Fra Angelico, the Accademia Gallery which houses among other works the David by Michelangelo (1501–1504), and the Piazza della Santissima Annunziata with the Loggia of the Innocenti by Filippo Brunelleschi.

Heading south from the Duomo there is the political and cultural center of Florence with Palazzo Vecchio and the Uffizi Gallery nearby, near which are the Bargello Museum and the Basilica of the Holy Cross. Crossing the Ponte Vecchio we arrive at the Oltrarno district with the Pitti Palace and the Boboli Gardens. Still in Oltrarno, there are the Basilica of the Holy Spirit by Filippo Brunelleschi and the Church of Santa Maria del Carmine, with frescoes by Masolino, Masaccio and Filippino Lippi.

In the area west of the Duomo is situated the imposing palace Palazzo Strozzi (home of major exhibitions and cultural institutions) and the Basilica of Santa Maria Novella, with the facade designed by Leon Battista Alberti.

The old town can be appreciated in its entirety from the surrounding hills, especially from Forte Belvedere, from the Piazzale Michelangelo with the Romanesque Basilica of San Miniato al Monte and the hills of Fiesole, which offers one of the most beautiful views of the Arno valley.

The northern part of the old town is surrounded by the avenues of Viali di Circonvallazione, a series of large six-lane avenues inspired by Parisian boulevard created when Florence was the capital of Italy.

The center of Florence, with its hundreds of business activities is a paradise for shopping and entertainment: elegant boutiques, historic cafes, the lively street markets, as well as hosting numerous nightclubs, discos, American-bar and meeting places for a drink (the famous Negroni cocktail was born here).

See also

 Squares of the historic centre of Florence

References

Sources

External links
 
 Gianfranco Caniggia offers a comprehensive survey of the development process of Florence since the Roman era in his lecture "A Structural Reading of Florence" presented at ETH Zurich in 1984 and reissued in 2022 as a film-video.

Historic districts
Quarters of Florence
Florence